Bharanakoodam is a 1994 Indian Malayalam-language political action film written and directed by Sunil and written by Sab John. It stars Babu Antony and Geetha.

Plot 

After murdering the Chief Minister of Kerala, Damodara Menon, by hiring a dangerous contract killer, Lawrence, Devaraj, a political kingmaker, forces Aravindaksha Menon into testifying against Dany, leader Alexander's nephew. He is helped by a corrupt Circle Inspector Sojan.

Dany manages to somehow escape from his custody and convinces Damodara Menon's daughter, Manju, that he is not the real killer. With the help of Manju, P. K. Raghavan and the honest Police Commissioner Venugopal, Dany sets out to prove his innocence.

Cast 

 Babu Antony as Dany
 Geetha as Manju
 Narendra Prasad as Devaraj
 Lalithasree as Excise Minister Parukutty
 Vijayaraghavan as P. K. Raghavan
 Rajan P Dev as Alexander
 Sukumaran as Commissioner/IG Venugopal IPS
 Vijayan as Tamil Nadu Minister
 Beena Antony as Mini
 Janardanan as Minister Aravindakshan
 Kuthiravattam Pappu as Minister Paaraadan
 M. G. Soman as C. M. Damodhara Menon
 KPAC Sunny as Minister
 Shammi Thilakan as CI Sojan
 Santha Devi as Manju's maid
 Augustine as Minister Suresh Chambakulam
 Ravi Jack as Lawrence D'Souza
 Kozhikode Narayanan Nair as Member of Ministry
 Abu Salim as Abu
 T. S. Krishnan as Indran
 Priyanka as Neeli
 Bindu Varappuzha as Party Member
 Tony as Alexander's assistant
 Pavithran as Party Member
 Swapna Ravi as Commissioner's wife

References

External links 
 

1990s Malayalam-language films
Films directed by Sunil
1994 films